Brendan Gillanders (born November 27, 1990) is a Canadian football running back for the Ottawa Redblacks of the Canadian Football League (CFL). He played CIS football at the University of Ottawa. He has also been a member of the Toronto Argonauts.

University career
Gillanders played for the Ottawa Gee-Gees from 2009 to 2013.

Professional career
Gillanders was signed by the Toronto Argonauts of the CFL on December 18, 2013. He signed with the CFL's Ottawa Redblacks on February 9, 2016.

References

External links
Just Sports Stats
Toronto Argonauts bio

Living people
1990 births
Canadian football fullbacks
Ottawa Gee-Gees football players
Toronto Argonauts players
Ottawa Redblacks players
Players of Canadian football from Ontario
Canadian football people from Ottawa